Tridrepana mediata is a moth in the family Drepanidae. It was described by Warren in 1922. It is found in New Guinea, extending to Goodenough Island and Sudest Island in the south-west.

The wingspan is about 29.4-33.4 mm for males and 34.2-42.2 mm for females. Adults are similar to Tridrepana albonotata, but can be distinguished by the dark brown colour of the male and the paler brown colour of the female.

References

Moths described in 1922
Drepaninae
Moths of New Guinea